

Josef Prinner (18 December 1894 – 1 July 1966) was a German general in the Wehrmacht during World War II. He was also a recipient of the Knight's Cross of the Iron Cross of Nazi Germany.

Awards and decorations

 Knight's Cross of the Iron Cross on 11 January 1945 as Generalleutnant and commander of Höherer Artilleriekommandeur 311

References

Citations

Bibliography

 

1894 births
1966 deaths
Lieutenant generals of the German Army (Wehrmacht)
German Army personnel of World War I
Military personnel from Munich
Recipients of the clasp to the Iron Cross, 1st class
Recipients of the Gold German Cross
Recipients of the Knight's Cross of the Iron Cross
People from the Kingdom of Bavaria
German police officers
German Army generals of World War II